Vladimir Aleksandrovich Popov (born 14 October 1978) is a former Russian football player.

Club career
He made his Russian Premier League debut for FC Saturn Ramenskoye on 5 May 2001 in a game against FC Rotor Volgograd.

References

1978 births
Footballers from Moscow
Living people
Russian footballers
FC Saturn Ramenskoye players
Russian Premier League players
FC Yenisey Krasnoyarsk players
FC Shakhter Karagandy players
Russian expatriate footballers
Expatriate footballers in Kazakhstan
Association football defenders
FC Chertanovo Moscow players